The 1996–97 League of Wales was the fifth season of the League of Wales since its establishment in 1992. The league was won for the second consecutive season by Barry Town, who accrued a record total of 105 points. Their total of 129 goals scored was also a record until they broke it by five goals the following year.

For the first time, the League champions competed in the subsequent Champions League.

League table

Results

References

Cymru Premier seasons
1996–97 in Welsh football leagues
Wales